Pruthvipal Solanki (born 14 February 1990) is an Indian cricketer. He made his List A debut on 3 March 2014, for Saurashtra in the 2013–14 Vijay Hazare Trophy.

References

External links
 

1990 births
Living people
Indian cricketers
Saurashtra cricketers
Place of birth missing (living people)